Armory Park Historic Residential District is a historic district in Tucson, Arizona.  It was listed on the NRHP in 1976 and the district boundaries were increased in 1996.

Part of the eastern section of the Armory Park Historic Residential District was first developed as  company housing for employees of the Southern Pacific Railroad. When the railroad moved out of this area and combined with Union Pacific Railroad, the houses were auctioned off and moved to other areas.

In 2000, a solar-powered housing development, known as Armory Park del Sol, was built here. Developer John Wesley Miller named the streets in the subdivision after historic people and events of the area, referring to both railroads that were important to its history.  This subdivision and its locally themed street names were featured in a December 2013 "Street Smarts" column, published in the Arizona Daily Star newspaper.

References

External links

 

Historic districts on the National Register of Historic Places in Arizona
Houses on the National Register of Historic Places in Arizona
Queen Anne architecture in Arizona
Neoclassical architecture in Arizona
Geography of Tucson, Arizona
Houses in Pima County, Arizona
1880 establishments in Arizona Territory
National Register of Historic Places in Tucson, Arizona